See:*List of sequenced algae genomes
List of sequenced animal genomes
 List of sequenced archaeal genomes
 List of sequenced bacterial genomes
 List of sequenced eukaryotic genomes
 List of sequenced fungi genomes
 List of sequenced plant genomes
 List of sequenced plastomes
 List of sequenced protist genomes
 

Biology-related lists